Robert Lister (1900 – 1995) was a Scottish footballer who played in the Football League for Exeter City and Stoke City.

Career
Lister was born in Glasgow and played for joined Partick Thistle in 1915 moved onto Heart of Midlothian and Dunfermline Athletic before joining English side Stoke City in 1927. He played once for Stoke which came in a 5–1 victory against Fulham at Craven Cottage (12 November 1927). He then joined West Ham United where he failed to make an appearance and left for Exeter City where he played eight times scoring once. He later went on to play for Rhyl and Shrewsbury Town.

Career statistics
Source:

References

Scottish footballers
Dunfermline Athletic F.C. players
Exeter City F.C. players
Stoke City F.C. players
Shrewsbury Town F.C. players
West Ham United F.C. players
English Football League players
1900 births
1995 deaths
Association football forwards